Łosiów railway station is a station in Łosiów, Opole Voivodeship, Poland.

Connections 

132 Bytom - Wrocław Główny

Train services
The station is served by the following service(s):

Regional services (PR) Wrocław Główny - Oława - Brzeg - Opole Główne
Regional service (PR) Wrocław - Oława - Brzeg - Opole Główne - Kędzierzyn-Koźle
Regional service (PR) Wrocław - Oława - Brzeg - Opole Główne - Kędzierzyn-Koźle - Racibórz
Regional service (PR) Wrocław - Oława - Brzeg - Opole Główne - Gliwice
Regional service (PR) Brzeg - Opole
Regional service (PR) Brzeg - Opole - Kędzierzyn-Koźle

References 

Brzeg County
Railway stations in Opole Voivodeship
Railway stations in Poland opened in 1843